John Anton Blatnik (August 17, 1911 – December 17, 1991) was a United States Congressman from Minnesota.  He was a member of the Minnesota Democratic-Farmer-Labor Party (DFL), which is affiliated with the Democratic Party.

Early life
Blatnik was born in Chisholm, Minnesota, to Slovene immigrant parents. He graduated from Winona State Teachers College (today Winona State University) and worked as a chemistry teacher in Chisholm.

Career
From 1940 to 1944, he served in the Minnesota State Senate and volunteered to serve in the United States Army Air Corps in 1942.  While in the Army Air Corps (the predecessor to the Air Force), he was chief of the Office of Strategic Services's mission with Tito's Yugoslav partisans for almost a year.

In 1946, Blatnik was elected to Congress representing Minnesota's 8th District in the northeastern part of the state, running on the newly unified ticket of the Minnesota Democratic-Farmer-Labor Party.  He was reelected 13 times without much difficulty.  He served in the 80th, 81st, 82nd, 83rd, 84th, 85th, 86th, 87th, 88th, 89th, 90th, 91st, 92nd, and 93rd congresses, (January 3, 1947 – December 31, 1974).

In 1963, Blatnik, introduced a bill to make Leif Erikson Day a nationwide observance. The following year Congress adopted this unanimously.

Blatnik voted for the Civil Rights Act of 1964. He was an early supporter of the Saint Lawrence Seaway and helped develop the original legislation to build it. He served as chairman of the Public Works Committee (now known as the Transportation and Infrastructure Committee) during his last two terms in Congress. As chairman, he shepherded the Federal Water Pollution Control Act, better known as the Clean Water Act, to passage in 1972.

Upon retirement, Blatnik endorsed his long-time administrative assistant, Jim Oberstar, to replace him in Congress; Oberstar won easily in the 1974 election.

Personal life and death
In 1955, Blatnik married the former Gisela Hager. They had three children. Blatnik died in Forest Heights, Maryland on December 17, 1991. He was survived by his second wife, the former Evelyn Castiglioni.

Legacy
The bridge for Interstate 535 crossing the Superior Bay and the Saint Louis Bay between Wisconsin and Minnesota was renamed the John A. Blatnik Bridge in his honor on September 24, 1971.

See also
U.S. Congressional Delegations from Minnesota

References

External links

Blatnik's role in environmental policy, from Minnesota Public Radio
Official Remarks by Congressman Glenn M. Anderson in honor of Blatnik
John A. Blatnik, Oral History Interview – 2/4/1966
 The John A. Blatnik Papers, including extensive records of his congressional service, are available for research use at the Minnesota Historical Society.

1911 births
1991 deaths
People from Chisholm, Minnesota
American people of Slovenian descent
Democratic Party members of the United States House of Representatives from Minnesota
Democratic Party Minnesota state senators
20th-century American politicians
Winona State University alumni
Civilian Conservation Corps people
People of the Office of Strategic Services
United States Army Air Forces soldiers
Military personnel from Minnesota
United States Army Air Forces personnel of World War II